Father is a 2020 Serbian film directed by Srdan Golubović. It premiered as part of the Panorama programme at the 70th Berlin International Film Festival, where it won the Audience Award and the Prize of the Ecumenical Jury. 

The film is based on the true story of a man from the Serbian town of Kragujevac, who, after his children had been taken away from him by local social services, travelled to Belgrade on foot in order to have his children returned to him.

Cast 

 Goran Bogdan as Nikola
 Boris Isaković as Vasiljević
 Nada Šargin as Biljana
 Milica Janevski as the Social Worker.

Critical reception 
Jessica Kiang of Variety had called the film "powerful, but grueling" and a "tough, but compelling downer".

Accolades

See also 

 List of Serbian films
 Cinema of Serbia
 FEST

References

Serbian drama films
2020 films
2020s Serbian-language films
Films shot in Belgrade
Films set in Belgrade
Films shot in Serbia
Films set in Serbia